The freguesias (civil parishes) of Portugal are listed in by municipality according to the following format:
 concelho
 freguesias

Sabrosa
Celeirós
Covas do Douro
Gouvães do Douro
Gouvinhas
Paços
Parada de Pinhão
Paradela de Guiães
Provesende
Sabrosa
São Cristóvão do Douro
São Lourenço de Ribapinhão
São Martinho de Antas
Souto Maior
Torre do Pinhão
Vilarinho de São Romão

Sabugal

Águas Belas
Aldeia da Ponte
Aldeia da Ribeira
Aldeia de Santo António
Aldeia do Bispo
Aldeia Velha
Alfaiates
Badamalos
Baraçal
Bendada
Bismula
Casteleiro
Cerdeira
Fóios
Forcalhos
Lajeosa
Lomba
Malcata
Moita
Nave
Pena Lobo
Pousafoles do Bispo
Quadrazais
Quinta de São Bartolomeu
Rapoula do Côa
Rebolosa
Rendo
Ruivós
Ruvina
Sabugal
Santo Estêvão
Seixo do Côa
Sortelha
Souto
Vale das Éguas
Vale de Espinho
Vale Longo
Vila Boa
Vila do Touro
Vilar Maior

Salvaterra de Magos
Foros de Salvaterra
Glória do Ribatejo
Granho
Marinhais
Muge
Salvaterra de Magos

Santa Comba Dão
Couto do Mosteiro
Nagozela
Ovoa
Pinheiro de Ázere
Santa Comba Dão
São Joaninho
São João de Areias
Treixedo
Vimieiro

Santa Cruz (Madeira)
Camacha
Caniço
Gaula
Santa Cruz
Santo António da Serra

Santa Cruz da Graciosa (Azores)
Guadalupe
Luz
Praia
Santa Cruz da Graciosa

Santa Cruz das Flores (Azores)
 Caveira
 Cedros
 Ponta Delgada
 Santa Cruz das Flores

Santa Maria da Feira

Argoncilhe
Arrifana
Caldas de São Jorge
Canedo
Escapães
Espargo
Feira
Fiães
Fornos
Gião
Guisande
Lobão
Louredo
Lourosa
Milheirós de Poiares
Mosteiró
Mozelos
Nogueira da Regedoura
Paços de Brandão
Pigeiros
Rio Meão
Romariz
Sanfins
Sanguedo
Santa Maria de Lamas
São João de Vêr
São Paio de Oleiros
Souto
Travanca
Vale
Vila Maior

Santa Marta de Penaguião
Alvações do Corgo
Cumeeira
Fontes
Fornelos
Lobrigos (São João Baptista)
Lobrigos (São Miguel)
Louredo
Medrões
Sanhoane
Sever

Santana (Madeira)
Arco de São Jorge
Faial
Ilha
Santana
São Jorge
São Roque do Faial

Santarém

Abitureiras
Abrã
Achete
Alcanede
Alcanhões
Almoster
Amiais de Baixo
Arneiro das Milhariças
Azoia de Baixo
Azoia de Cima
Casével
Gançaria
Moçarria
Pernes
Pombalinho
Póvoa da Isenta
Póvoa de Santarém
Romeira
Santa Iria da Ribeira de Santarém
Santarém (Marvila)
Santarém (São Nicolau)
Santarém (São Salvador)
São Vicente do Paul
Tremês
Vale de Figueira
Vale de Santarém
Vaqueiros
Várzea

Santiago do Cacém
Abela
Alvalade
Cercal
Ermidas-Sado
Santa Cruz
Santiago do Cacém
Santo André
São Bartolomeu da Serra
São Domingos
São Francisco da Serra
Vale de Água

Santo Tirso

Agrela
Água Longa
Areias
Burgães
Campo (São Martinho)
Carreira
Couto (Santa Cristina)
Couto (São Miguel)
Guimarei
Lama
Lamelas
Monte Córdova
Negrelos (São Mamede)
Negrelos (São Tomé)
Palmeira
Rebordões
Refojos de Riba de Ave
Reguenga
Roriz
Santo Tirso
São Salvador do Campo
Sequeiró
Vila das Aves
Vilarinho

São Brás de Alportel
São Brás de Alportel
São João da Madeira
São João da Madeira

São João da Pesqueira
Castanheiro do Sul
Ervedosa do Douro
Espinhosa
Nagozelo do Douro
Paredes da Beira
Pereiros
Riodades
São João da Pesqueira
Soutelo do Douro
Trevões
Vale de Figueira
Valongo dos Azeites
Várzea de Trevões
Vilarouco

São Pedro do Sul
Baiões
Bordonhos
Candal
Carvalhais
Covas do Rio
Figueiredo de Alva
Manhouce
Pindelo dos Milagres
Pinho
Santa Cruz da Trapa
São Cristóvão de Lafões
São Félix
São Martinho das Moitas
São Pedro do Sul
Serrazes
Sul
Valadares
Várzea
Vila Maior

São Roque do Pico (Azores)
Prainha
Santa Luzia
Santo Amaro
Santo António
São Roque

São Vicente (Madeira)
Boa Ventura
Ponta Delgada
São Vicente

Sardoal
Alcaravela
Santiago de Montalegre
Sardoal
Valhascos

Sátão
Águas Boas
Avelal
Decermilo
Ferreira de Aves
Forles
Mioma
Rio de Moinhos
Romãs
São Miguel de Vila Boa
Sátão
Silvã de Cima
Vila Longa

Seia

Alvoco da Serra
Cabeça
Carragozela
Folhadosa
Girabolhos
Lajes
Lapa dos Dinheiros
Loriga
Paranhos
Pinhanços
Sabugueiro
Sameice
Sandomil
Santa Comba
Santa Eulália
Santa Marinha
Santiago
São Martinho
São Romão
Sazes da Beira
Seia
Teixeira
Torrozelo
Tourais
Travancinha
Valezim
Várzea de Meruge
Vide
Vila Cova à Coelheira

Seixal
Aldeia de Paio Pires
Amora
Arrentela
Corroios
Fernão Ferro
Seixal

Sernancelhe
Arnas
Carregal
Chosendo
Cunha
Escurquela
Faia
Ferreirim
Fonte Arcada
Freixinho
Granjal
Lamosa
Macieira
Penso
Quintela
Sarzeda
Sernancelhe
Vila da Ponte

Serpa
Aldeia Nova de São Bento
Brinches
Pias
Serpa (Salvador)
Serpa (Santa Maria)
Vale de Vargo
Vila Verde de Ficalho

Sertã
Cabeçudo
Carvalhal
Castelo
Cernache do Bonjardim
Cumeada
Ermida
Figueiredo
Marmeleiro
Nesperal
Palhais
Pedrógão Pequeno
Sertã
Troviscal
Várzea dos Cavaleiros

Sesimbra
Quinta do Conde
Sesimbra (Castelo)
Sesimbra (Santiago)

Setúbal
Azeitão
Gâmbia-Pontes-Alto da Guerra

Setúbal

Sever do Vouga
Cedrim
Couto de Esteves
Dornelas
Paradela
Pessegueiro do Vouga
Rocas do Vouga
Sever do Vouga
Silva Escura
Talhadas

Silves
Alcantarilha
Algoz
Armação de Pêra
Pêra
São Bartolomeu de Messines
São Marcos da Serra
Silves
Tunes

Sines
Porto Covo
Sines

Sintra
Agualva
Agualva-Cacém
Algueirão - Mem Martins
Almargem do Bispo
Belas
Casal de Cambra
Colares
Massamá
Mira-Sintra
Monte Abraão
Montelavar
Pêro Pinheiro
Queluz
Rio de Mouro
São João das Lampas
São Marcos
Sintra (Santa Maria e São Miguel)
Sintra (São Martinho)
Sintra (São Pedro de Penaferrim)
Terrugem

Sobral de Monte Agraço
Santo Quintino
Sapataria
Sobral de Monte Agraço

Soure
Alfarelos
Brunhós
Degracias
Figueiró do Campo
Gesteira
Granja do Ulmeiro
Pombalinho
Samuel
Soure
Tapéus
Vila Nova de Anços
Vinha da Rainha

Sousel
Cano
Casa Branca
Santo Amaro
Sousel

S